The Calhoun Correctional Institution  is a state prison for men located in Blountstown, Calhoun County, Florida, owned and operated by the Florida Department of Corrections.  This facility has a mix of security levels, including minimum, medium, and close, and houses adult male offenders.  Calhoun first opened in 1984 and has a maximum capacity of 1354 prisoners.

References

Prisons in Florida
Buildings and structures in Calhoun County, Florida
1984 establishments in Florida